Sexy Toto (Italian: Totòsexy) is a 1963 Italian comedy film directed by Mario Amendola and starring Totò and Erminio Macario. It consisted of a mere montage of scenes discarded from Toto's First Night. It attracted around 880,000 spectators, considerably less than usual for a Totò films.

Plot
After being arrested for criminal activities, two street musicians swap sexy stories with the other inmates.

Cast

References

Bibliography
 Ennio Bìspuri. Totò: principe clown : tutti i film di Totò. Guida Editori, 1997.

External links

1963 films
1963 comedy films
Italian comedy films
1960s Italian-language films
Films directed by Mario Amendola
Films with screenplays by Giovanni Grimaldi
Films with screenplays by Bruno Corbucci
Films scored by Armando Trovajoli
1960s Italian films